Vincent Mazzeo (born January 6, 1964) is an American Democratic Party politician who served in the New Jersey General Assembly from 2014 to 2022, representing the 2nd Legislative District.

Early life 
Mazzeo is part owner of B.F. Mazzeo, a grocery store. Prior to serving as mayor, Mazzeo served on the Northfield City Council from 2003 until 2007 and was the president of the council. He then served as Mayor from 2008-2014. He received a bachelor's degree from Glassboro State College (now Rowan University) and is married to Gerri. They have two children.

New Jersey Assembly 
In the 2013 elections, Mazzeo ran for a seat in the General Assembly and was declared the winner by 32 votes over Republican Party incumbent John F. Amodeo. Amodeo filed for a recount after Mazzeo had been declared the winner by a margin of 38 votes among the more than 100,000 ballots cast and conceded to Mazzeo shortly after a month-long process showed Mazzeo ahead by 51 votes. With Republican Chris A. Brown leaving the Assembly to run for Senate in the November 2017 general election, Mazzeo and his running mate, newcomer John Armato, defeated Republican challengers Vince Sera and Brenda Taube to win both Assembly seats from the district for the Democrats.

Tenure 
Mazzeo has said he might challenge Chris A. Brown for New Jersey Senate in 2021.

Committee assignments 

Tourism and Gaming
State and Local Government 
Labor

Electoral history

Assembly

References

External links
Assemblyman Vince Mazzeo's legislative web page
New Jersey Legislature financial disclosure forms
2016 2015 2014 2013
 

Living people
1964 births
Mayors of places in New Jersey
Democratic Party members of the New Jersey General Assembly
New Jersey city council members
People from Northfield, New Jersey
Politicians from Atlantic County, New Jersey
21st-century American politicians